Chris Wherry (born July 18, 1973) is a former professional road racing cyclist from Boulder, Colorado.  In 2006, he wore the jersey of the United States National Road Race Champion, having won the event in 2005.

Wherry is one of a series of professional riders who started in the sport through the Red Zinger Mini Classics youth bicycle series in Colorado.

Major results

1996
 1st  Road race, National Amateur Road Championships
1998
 3rd Overall Redlands Bicycle Classic
1999
 1st Overall Tour of the Gila
 2nd Overall Fitchburg Longsjo Classic
 3rd Time trial, National Road Championships
 3rd Overall Coors Classic
 4th Overall Tour of Japan
2000
 3rd Overall Ringerike GP
 9th Overall Tour de Langkawi
2001
 3rd Overall Tour de Langkawi
 3rd Overall Cascade Classic
1st Stage 1
 5th Overall Tour du Limousin
 9th San Francisco Grand Prix
2002
 1st Overall Saturn Cycling Classic
 1st Overall Tour of the Gila
 1st Overall Cascade Classic
 1st Overall Valley of the Sun Stage Race
 2nd First Union Invitational
2004
 1st Stage 2 Boulder Stage Race
 6th Time trial, National Road Championships
2005
 National Road Championships
1st  Road race/Philadelphia International Cycling Classic
5th Time trial
 1st Overall Redlands Bicycle Classic
1st Prologue
 1st Stage 3 International Tour de Toona
 3rd Overall UCI America Tour
2006
 1st Overall Cascade Classic
1st Stage 1
 1st Stages 2 & 3 Tour of Utah
 1st Stage 3 Tour de Nez
 5th Road race, National Road Championships
 7th Overall Tour of the Gila
 8th Reading Classic
2007 
 4th Overall Redlands Bicycle Classic
 4th Overall Tour de Toona

References

1973 births
Living people
American male cyclists
American cycling road race champions